Worcester Historic District is a national historic district located at Worcester in Otsego County, New York.  It encompasses 24 contributing buildings representing the social and economic nucleus of the town.  It is composed partially of frame buildings whose street fronts are distinguished by false fronts or "boomtown" facades and a variety of commercial and residential structures.

It was listed on the National Register of Historic Places in 1975.

References

Historic districts on the National Register of Historic Places in New York (state)
Houses on the National Register of Historic Places in New York (state)
Historic districts in Otsego County, New York
National Register of Historic Places in Otsego County, New York